Francis Burrall Hoffman (March 6, 1882 – November 27, 1980) was an American-born architect, best known for his work with James Deering’s Villa Vizcaya in Miami, Florida.

Biography
Francis Burrall Hoffman, Jr. was born to a wealthy and socially prominent New York family line that began with the emigration of Martin Hermanzen Hoffman from Sweden in 1657. The family remained closely tied to the history and politics of the state, with Hoffman's  great-grandfather, Murray Hoffman serving as a Justice of the Supreme Court of New York and his grandfather, Wickham Hoffman acting as the United States Minister to Denmark from 1883-93.

Hoffman attended Harvard University, graduating in 1903. Hoffman spent his senior year as an apprentice at Carrere & Hastings, an architectural firm in New York. From 1903 to 1907, Hoffman attended the École des Beaux-Arts in Paris, graduated with honors and returned to Carrere & Hastings in 1907.

In 1910, Hoffman left Carrere & Hastings to begin his own architectural firm in Manhattan. He shared an office space, as well as collaborating on projects with Henry Creighton Ingalls. Hoffman's first commission was a mausoleum in the Woodlawn Cemetery for Edmund Walstein Davis.

In 1912, Hoffman was hired by James Deering as an associate architect for Villa Vizcaya. Collaborating with Paul Chalfin and Diego Suarez, the bayfront Italian style villa would become the largest and most notable project of his sixty-year career.

Hoffman left the Villa Vizcaya project five years later in 1917 to enlist in the Army. During World War I, Hoffman served as Captain with the Corps of Engineers and later directed camouflage operations with the Second Corps, A.E.F. During World War II, Hoffman served overseas as a Lieutenant Commander in the Navy.

In 1927, Hoffman married Virginia "Dolly" Kimball. Kimball was from a wealthy Virginia publishing family and quickly established a career as an interior decorator, and was often enlisted in the design of her husband's projects. After the stock market crash in 1929, Hoffman closed up his firm in New York and he and Dolly spent a majority of their time traveling between New York and Paris. Upon his returns to New York, Hoffman rarely engaged in more than one architectural project a year.

Hoffman completed many commissions, mostly designing large houses for wealthy clients. Hoffman's last project was completed in 1974. When he was nearly ninety-eight years old Hoffman died in 1980 in Hobe Sound, Florida.

Hoffman & Vizcaya
Attained through his Harvard connections, Hoffman's first large and most notable commission was James Deering’s Villa Vizcaya in Miami, Florida.

Wealthy industrialist, James Deering and his art director, Paul Chalfin spent many years amassing a large collection of architectural and decorative artifacts from around the Europe. In 1912,  thirty -year -old F. Burrall Hoffman was hired to design a winter home for Deering to showcase his collection. Deering purchased 130 acres of swampy mangrove on the shore of Biscayne Bay. As early 1913, Hoffman began sketches for the site. Inspired by the Villa Rezzonico in Bassano del Grappa, Italy, Deering and Chalfin decided that the palatial bayfront mansion would be an Italian Style. Typical of his Beaux-Art training, Hoffman designed a roughly square building that functioned on two axes intersecting at the center of the courtyard. The two axes, major and minor correspond to the movement of more important to less important features of the house. The major axis travels east-west from the entrance through the court to the waterside terrace. The minor axis outlines the secondary movement to the gardens. Hoffman ingeniously designed the public rooms in a U-shape to indicate the suggested movement of guests from loggia to entrance, continuing around to the dining room, while providing the living room and dining room direct access to the waterside terrace.

Hoffman worked in collaboration with Paul Chalfin until 1916 - when the project was turned entirely over to Chalfin for furnishing. Deering arrived at Villa Vizcaya on his yacht, Nepenthe on Christmas Day, 1916. Deering spent winters at the home until his death in 1925.

After an Architectural Review in 1917 cited Chalfin and Hoffman as "associate architects" and failed to mention the contribution of landscape architect, Diego Suarez, Hoffman took issue with Chalfin's oversight and never spoke to him again. Hoffman, true to his reputation as the "gentleman architect" never took action to correct this specific article, but he would later take action to correct the record overall, see below.

In 1953, Dade County purchased the home from the Deering heirs. In March of that year, the New York Times published an article that completely ignored Hoffman's contribution to the design of Villa Vizcaya (only attributing the plumbing to him) and credited Paul Chalfin. After thirty-five years of ignoring Chalfin's claims to the architecture of Vizcaya, Hoffman met with an attorney and planned to sue over the gross misrepresentation of the article. A retraction was printed on May 17, 1953.

Hoffman’s Work
Though Hoffman is best known for his work with Villa Vizcaya, he had a successful and distinguished career, completing projects mainly in New York and Florida. A majority of Hoffman's works were private homes for wealthy clients in Neo-Classical or Mediterranean styles.

Selected works
 Edmund Walstein Davis Mausoleum, Woodlawn Cemetery (Bronx, New York) (1908)
 Ballyshear: Home of Charles B. Macdonald, Southampton, New York (1915)
 Heamaw: Home of Mrs. Frederick Guest, West Palm Beach, Florida (1916)
 Villa Artemis: Home of Henry Carnegie Phipps, West Palm Beach, Florida, (1916)
 17 East 91st Street, New York City: Home of Charlotte Winthrop Fowler, (1917)
 Music Room for Joseph Riter, Palm Beach, Florida, (1920).

References

20th-century American architects
1882 births
1980 deaths
Architects from New Orleans
Harvard University alumni
Architects from Miami
People from Hobe Sound, Florida